Elections for the 2019 European Parliament election took place in Slovakia on 25 May 2019. Thirty-one parties featured on the electoral list. The election was won by alliance of Progressive Slovakia and TOGETHER - Civic Democracy. It was the first election since 2006 that was won by some other party than Direction – Social Democracy.

Main contesting parties

Results

European groups

Elected members

PS – ALDE
 Michal Šimečka, by 81,735 preferential votes 
 Martin Hojsík, by 27,549 preferential votes

SPOLU – EPP
 Michal Wiezik, by 29,998 preferential votes (now he is member of PS and Renew Europe)
 Vladimír Bilčík, by 26,202 preferential votes 

Smer – S&D
 Monika Beňová, by 89,472 preferential votes
 Miroslav Číž, by 51,362 preferential votes
 Robert Hajšel, by 13,773 preferential votes

ĽSNS – APF
 Milan Uhrík, by 42,779 preferential votes (now he is leader of movement Republika)
 Miroslav Radačovský, by 42,276 preferential votes (now he is leader of Slovak patriot)

KDH – EPP
 Ivan Štefanec, by 33,128 preferential votes
 Miriam Lexmann, by 27,833 preferential votes

SaS – AECR
 Lucia Ďuriš Nicholsonová, by 52,331 preferential votes (now she left SaS and she became independent on slovak national level, on EU level she became member of Renew Europe)
 Eugen Jurzyca, by 33,540 preferential votes

OĽaNO – EPP
 Peter Pollák, by 23,815 preferential votes

Post-election changes of Europarties

On 5 June, Peter Pollák announced that he is switching from AECR to EPP.

Lucia Ďuriš Nicholsonová switched from ECR to Renew Europe.

Michal Wiezik switched from EPP to Renew Europe.

Opinion polls

Parties

 SMER
 Kresťanská demokracia (Christian Democracy)
 Kotleba – People's Party Our Slovakia
 Korektúra
 Slovak National Party
 We Are Family
 Ordinary People
 Starostovia a nezávislí kandidáti
 Strana práce
 Strana tolerancie a spolunažívania
 Hlas ľudu
 Maďarská kresťanskodemokratická aliancia
 Doprava
 Christian Democratic Movement
 Slovak Green Party
 Most–Híd
 PRIAMA DEMOKRACIA
 Strana rómskej koalície - SRK
 Slovak Conservative Party
 Slovenská národná jednota
 Party of the Hungarian Community
 Doma dobre
 Communist Party of Slovakia and VZDOR
 EURÓPSKA DEMOKRATICKÁ STRANA
 Freedom and Solidarity
 Slovenská ľudová strana Andreja Hlinku
 NAJ – Nezávislosť a Jednota
 Kresťanská únia
 Progressive Slovakia and TOGETHER – Civic Democracy
 Demokratická strana
 Národná koalícia

Sources

Slovakia
2019 in Slovakia
European Parliament elections in Slovakia
2019 elections in Slovakia